Halgodari-ye Ashraf (also Romanized as Halgodāri Āshraf; also known as Khalaqdāri-ye Āshraf) is a village in Negur Rural District, Dashtiari District, Chabahar County, Sistan and Baluchestan Province, Iran. At the 2006 census, its population was 243, in 42 families.

References 

Populated places in Chabahar County